Pangi (also Romanized as Pangī; also known as Panqi) is a village in Roqicheh Rural District, Kadkan District, Torbat-e Heydarieh County, Razavi Khorasan Province, Iran. At the 2006 census, its population was 233, in 51 families.

References 

Populated places in Torbat-e Heydarieh County